Eristena auropunctalis is a moth in the family Crambidae. It was described by George Hampson in 1903. It is found in Bhutan.

References

Acentropinae
Moths described in 1903